AC/DC Live is the second live album by Australian hard rock band AC/DC, released on 27 October 1992. Two versions were released, one containing a single CD, with the second version being a double album on LP and CD known as AC/DC Live: 2 CD Collector's Edition. A feature-length live video, AC/DC: Live at Donington, was released concurrently. The double album AC/DC Live: 2 CD Collector's Edition was released a month after the single-disc version, in a slipcased two-disc "book" (similar in shape to old CD longboxes) and containing an AC/DC dollar note known as "Angus Bucks". Both editions of the album were re-released in 2003 as part of the AC/DC Remasters series.

Reception 

Barry Weber of AllMusic writes: "All too often, a live album is a cheaply made, rushed recording that only serves as a testament to a band's decline. AC/DC Live, however, shows what makes this band different from their peers - here they are still entirely capable of pulling off a great live show. This ranks among the best live metal albums of the '90s." Classic Rock wrote that "Live is a triumphant refutation to anyone who still claims 'DC died with Bon. Jonno [Brian Johnson] is in fine voice and good humour throughout, and the live setting gives Angus space to stretch out a bit."

Track listings

1 CD edition

2 CD "Collector's Edition"

The Japanese version includes the bonus track "Hell Ain't a Bad Place to Be" (Donington Park, Leicestershire, England; 17 August 1991) which was the b-side of the "Highway To Hell" (live) single. This track was later included on the deluxe edition of Backtracks in 2009.

Even though "Sin City" appears to be performed at the Point Theatre in Dublin on 26 April 1991, as Brian Johnson says in the intro on the album, "We've got a song for you, Dublin", at the real Dublin show he actually said, "OK Dublin, we've got a song especially for you" (a bootleg recording of the show exists).  The intro on the album is taken from the performance at King's Hall in Belfast on 27 April 1991 - Johnson mentioning Dublin is a genuine mistake. The performance itself was recorded at the NEC in Birmingham on 23 April 1991.

The sound of the audience and guitar feedback at the very start of "Shoot to Thrill" is taken from the Donington performance where the previous track, "Thunderstruck", was recorded. The performance itself was recorded at the NEC in Birmingham on 23 April 1991.

Vinyl 2 LP "Collector's Edition"

"Moneytalks" and "Are You Ready" were excluded from the vinyl set.

Charts

Weekly charts

Original version

Collector's Edition

Certifications

Personnel
Brian Johnson – lead vocals
Angus Young – lead guitar, backing vocals in T.N.T and Dirty Deeds Done Dirt Cheap
Malcolm Young – rhythm guitar, backing vocals
Cliff Williams – bass guitar, backing vocals
Chris Slade – drums, percussion

See also
 Live at Donington (AC/DC)
 Plug Me In
 Backtracks

References

1992 live albums
Albums produced by Bruce Fairbairn
AC/DC live albums